Jurassic World: Original Motion Picture Soundtrack is the film score to Jurassic World composed by Michael Giacchino. The album was released digitally and physically on June 9, 2015 by Back Lot Music.

Background
Giacchino previously scored the video games Warpath: Jurassic Park and The Lost World: Jurassic Park. The score also includes the Jurassic Park theme by John Williams. Giacchino stated: "It was a really targeted approach, as to where to [include Williams' themes] and where would make the most sense and where would we most appreciate it, as fans ourselves".

Track listing

Charts

See also
 Jurassic Park (film score)
 The Lost World: Jurassic Park (film score)
 Jurassic Park III (film score)

References

External links

 
 
 
 

2015 soundtrack albums
2010s film soundtrack albums
Back Lot Music soundtracks
Adventure film soundtracks
Jurassic Park film scores
Michael Giacchino soundtracks